Ian John McParland (born 4 October 1961) is a Scottish former professional football player and manager.  He played professionally as a striker with a number of teams and he is most known for his eight-year spell with Notts County, a club he later managed. He now features as a pundit on weekly football talk show 'Team Talk' on Notts TV.

Playing career 
McParland grew up in Tranent, East Lothian and after leaving an apprenticeship with Sunderland due to homesickness worked for two years in the Lothian coal mining industry whilst playing for Ormiston Primrose. McParland was with Notts County from 1980 to 1988, then had spells at Hull City, Walsall, Dunfermline Athletic, Lincoln City, Northampton Town, Instant-Dict (Hong Kong), Eastern AA (Hong Kong), Hamilton Academical and Berwick Rangers.

Coaching and management

Nottingham Forest

McParland eventually went to Nottingham Forest as a coach. He was with Forest for over 10 years and was the reserve team coach for most of that time. When Gary Megson left the club in February 2006, he was put in temporary charge with Frank Barlow in a joint first team management role.

He and Barlow were named Managers of the Month for March 2006, when they went 10 games unbeaten, with 6 straight wins, including a 7-1 victory over Swindon Town at the City Ground. McParland just missed out on equalling a club record of 7 straight wins when Forest fell to a 3-2 defeat at the hands of Hartlepool United. Despite Forest narrowly missing out on the League One playoffs, McParland was still the favourite to land the Forest job (with Barlow) on a permanent basis. After Colin Calderwood was named the permanent successor to Megson, McParland and Barlow became coaches for the Forest first team.

Notts County

He was announced as the new Notts County manager in October 2007. McParland enjoyed a two-year spell in charge and, despite the appointment of Sven-Göran Eriksson as Director of Football, the club decided to retain his services. McParland was sacked on 12 October 2009, however, with the club in fifth place in League Two.

Ipswich Town

He joined Ipswich as part of Roy Keane's coaching staff on 27 November 2009. On 7 January 2011 he took over as caretaker manager for the departed Keane, and in his first game suffered a 7–0 defeat to Premier League side Chelsea. His second and final game in charge was the home leg of the League Cup semi-final against Arsenal on 12 January 2011, which Ipswich won 1-0. He was replaced permanently by Paul Jewell on 13 January 2011.

Swindon Town

McParland joined Swindon Town on 3 March 2011 as assistant to Paul Hart who had taken over the manager's role. He left the club in April 2011 following relegation to League Two.

Return to Forest

On 28 February 2013, McParland was appointed the under-21 coach at former club Nottingham Forest, returning to the club after an absence of over five years.

Managerial statistics

Honours
Player

Individual
PFA Team of the Year: 1987–88 Third Division

Manager

Individual
League One Manager of the Month: March 2006

References

External links 
 Career statistics

1961 births
Living people
Footballers from Edinburgh
Scottish footballers
Notts County F.C. players
Hull City A.F.C. players
Walsall F.C. players
Dunfermline Athletic F.C. players
Lincoln City F.C. players
Sliema Wanderers F.C. players
Northampton Town F.C. players
Hamilton Academical F.C. players
Berwick Rangers F.C. players
Double Flower FA players
Eastern Sports Club footballers
Scottish Football League players
English Football League players
Hong Kong First Division League players
Hong Kong League XI representative players
Scottish expatriate footballers
Expatriate footballers in Hong Kong
Scottish expatriate sportspeople in Hong Kong
Scottish football managers
Nottingham Forest F.C. managers
Notts County F.C. managers
Ipswich Town F.C. managers
Association football forwards
Ipswich Town F.C. non-playing staff